Daniela Bobadilla (born April 4, 1993) is a Canadian actress. She is best known for playing Sam Goodson in the FX series Anger Management. She has also appeared in other film and television roles, such as Mr. Troop Mom, the NBC drama Awake, the ABC series The Middle, and the Lifetime original movies Lies in Plain Sight, The Cheating Pact and Perfect High.

Early life
Bobadilla was born in Mexico City to parents Carlos and Haydee. She is of Mexican and Spanish descent. Her family relocated to North Vancouver, British Columbia and then to nearby Coquitlam. She showed an aptitude for performing at an early age, and as well as an affinity for figure skating. While attending Summit Middle School, she took up acting with the school's theater department, and then with the Theatrix Youththeatre Society. She went on to perform in numerous productions including Fiddler on the Roof, High School Musical and The Wizard of Oz. She began  auditioning for film and television roles while attending Heritage Woods Secondary School.

Career

In 2008, Bobadilla won the title of Port Moody Idol. Shortly thereafter, she appeared in guest roles on two Canadian-produced series for The CW, Smallville and Supernatural, later relocating with her family to Los Angeles. She appeared in her first American leading role in the Lifetime movie Lies in Plain Sight, in which she portrayed a 13-year-old blind adolescent. She later appeared on an episode of Lie to Me, as well as the Hallmark Channel's Oliver's Ghost.

In 2012, she was cast as Sam Goodson, the 13-year-old, obsessive-compulsive daughter of Charlie Sheen's character on the FX series Anger Management. The role quickly became Bobadilla's most extensive, when the series was picked up for a continuous, syndicated run of 100 episodes (her character appeared in 55 episodes).

In 2013, she played the main character, Heather, in the Lifetime movie, The Cheating Pact. In 2015, Bobadilla was cast as a primary character in another Lifetime film, Perfect High. Beginning in the seventh season of the ABC comedy series The Middle, Bobadilla played the recurring role of Lexie Brooks, Sue Heck's college roommate and later Axl’s girlfriend.

Personal life
In 2018, Bobadilla married her The Middle costar Beau Wirick.

Filmography

Film

Television

References

External links
 
 

1993 births
Living people
Actresses of Mexican descent 
Canadian child actresses
Canadian film actresses
Canadian television actresses
Canadian people of Mexican descent
Canadian people of Spanish descent
Mexican emigrants to Canada
Mexican people of Spanish descent
People from Coquitlam
21st-century Canadian actresses